Baron Pierre Charles François Dupin (6 October 1784, Varzy, Nièvre – 18 January 1873, Paris, France) was a French Catholic mathematician, engineer, economist and politician, particularly known for work in the field of mathematics, where the Dupin cyclide and Dupin indicatrix are named after him; and for his work in the field of statistical and thematic mapping. In 1826 he created the earliest known choropleth map.

Life and work 
He was born in Varzy in France, the son of Charles Andre Dupin, a lawyer, and Catherine Agnes Dupin.

Dupin studied geometry with Monge at the École Polytechnique and then became a naval engineer (ENSTA). His mathematical work was in descriptive and differential geometry. He was the discoverer of conjugate tangents to a point on a surface and of the Dupin indicatrix.
Dupin participated in the Greek science revival by teaching mathematics and mechanics lessons in Corfu in 1808. One of his students was Giovanni Carandino, who would go on to be the founder of the Greek Mathematics School in the 1820s.

From 1807 Dupin was responsible for the restoration of the damaged port and arsenal at Corfu. He founded the Toulon Maritime Museum in 1813.

In 1818, Dupin was elected to the body of the French Academy of Sciences, one of the Institut de France's five Academies.

He was appointed professor at the Conservatoire des Arts et Métiers in 1819; he kept this post until 1854. In 1822, Dupin was elected a foreign member of the Royal Swedish Academy of Sciences.
In 1826 he published a thematic map showing the distribution of illiteracy in France, using shadings (from black to white), the first known instance of what is called a choropleth map today. Dupin had been inspired by the work of the German statisticians Georg Hassel and August Friedrich Wilhelm Crome.
Dupin was named rapporteur for the central jury of the Exposition des produits de l'industrie française en 1834.
For each branch of industry he noted the quantities and value of French exports and imports, with comparative figures for 1823, 1827 and 1834.

Dupin also had a political career and was appointed to the Senate in 1852.

Selected publications 

 Dupin, François Pierre Charles. Développements de géométrie. (1813).
 Dupin, François Pierre Charles. Discours et leçons sur l'industrie, le commerce, la marine, et sur les sciences appliquées aux arts. 1825.
 Dupin, François Pierre Charles. Canal maritime de Suez. Imprimerie de Mallet-Bachelier, 1858.

References

External links 
 
 
 Entry in MacTutor History of Mathematics

1784 births
1873 deaths
People from Nièvre
French Roman Catholics
Politicians from Bourgogne-Franche-Comté
Orléanists
Party of Order politicians
Bonapartists
Members of the Chamber of Deputies of the Bourbon Restoration
Members of the 1st Chamber of Deputies of the July Monarchy
Members of the 2nd Chamber of Deputies of the July Monarchy
Members of the 3rd Chamber of Deputies of the July Monarchy
Members of the 1848 Constituent Assembly
Members of the National Legislative Assembly of the French Second Republic
French Senators of the Second Empire
18th-century French mathematicians
19th-century French mathematicians
Differential geometers
Information visualization experts
French civil engineers
École Polytechnique alumni
Members of the French Academy of Sciences
Members of the Royal Swedish Academy of Sciences